Ampacity is a portmanteau for ampere capacity defined by National Electrical Codes, in some North American countries. Ampacity is defined as the maximum current, in amperes, that a conductor can carry continuously under the conditions of use without exceeding its temperature rating. Also described as current-carrying capacity.

The ampacity of a conductor depends on its ability to dissipate heat without damage to the conductor or its insulation. This is a function of the 
insulation temperature rating, the electrical resistance of the conductor material, the ambient temperature, and the ability of the insulated conductor to dissipate heat to the surrounds.

All common electrical conductors have some resistance to the flow of electricity. Electric current flowing through them causes voltage drop and power dissipation, which heats conductors. Copper or aluminum can conduct a large amount of current without damage, but long before conductor damage, insulation would, typically, be damaged by the resultant heat.

The ampacity for a conductor is based on physical and electrical properties of the material and construction of the conductor and of its insulation, ambient temperature, and environmental conditions adjacent to the conductor. Having a large overall surface area can dissipate heat well if the environment can absorb the heat.

In electrical cables different conditions govern, and installation regulations normally specify that the most severe condition along the run will govern each cable conductor's rating. Cables run in wet or oily locations may carry a lower temperature rating than in a dry installation. Derating is necessary for multiple cables in proximity. When multiple cables are in proximity, each contributes heat to the others and diminishes the amount of external cooling affecting the individual cable conductors. The overall ampacity of insulated cable conductors  in a bundle of more than three cables must also be derated, whether in a raceway or cable. Usually the derating factor is tabulated in a nation's wiring regulations.

Depending on the type of insulating material, common maximum allowable temperatures at the surface of the conductor are 60, 75, and 90 °C, often with an ambient air temperature of 30 °C. In the United States, 105 °C is allowed with ambient of 40 °C, for larger power cables, especially those operating at more than 2 kV. Likewise, specific insulations are rated 150, 200, or 250 °C.

The allowed current in a conductor generally needs to be decreased (derated) when conductors are in a grouping or cable, enclosed in conduit, or an enclosure restricting heat dissipation. e.g. The United States National Electrical Code, Table 310.15(B)(16), specifies that up to three 8 AWG copper wires having a common insulating material (THWN) in a raceway, cable, or direct burial has an ampacity of 50 A when the ambient air is 30 °C, the conductor surface temperature allowed to be 75 °C.  A single insulated conductor in free air has 70 A rating.

Ampacity rating is normally for continuous current, and short periods of overcurrent occur without harm in most cabling systems. Electrical code rules will give ratings for wiring where short-term loads are present, for example, in a hoisting motor.  For systems such as underground power transmission cables, evaluation of the short-term over-load capacity of the cable system requires a detailed analysis of the cable's thermal environment and an evaluation of the commercial value of the lost service life due to excess temperature rise.

Design of an electrical system will normally include consideration of the current-carrying capacity of all conductors of the system.

Some devices are limited by power rating, and when this power rating occurs below their current limit, it is not necessary to know the current limit to design a system. A common example of this is lightbulb holders.

Current rating
For electronic components (such as transistors, voltage regulators, and the like), the term current rating is more-commonly used than ampacity, but the considerations are broadly similar. However the tolerance of short-term overcurrent is near zero for semiconductor devices, as their thermal capacities are extremely small.

References

External links
myCableEngineering - ampacity sizing appliction to BS 7671, ERA 69-30 and IEC 60502
Wire and Cable Ampacity Ratings
BS 7671:2008 Cable Sizing Tool
Online Cable Sizing Tool to IEC 60364-5-52:2009

Cables
Electrical wiring